The PFL 3 mixed martial arts event for the 2023 season of the Professional Fighters League was held on April 14, 2023, at The Theater at Virgin Hotels in Las Vegas, Nevada, United States. This marked the third regular-season event of the tournament and included fights in the Lightweight and Welterweight divisions.

Background 
The first round of the PFL regular season will end at this event, with Olivier Aubin-Mercier (17-5) facing Shane Burgos (15-3), a free-agent acquisition in the lightweight division. In the welterweight division, Sadibou Sy (13-6-2) will meet Jarrah Al-Silawi (18-4).

Fight card

Standings After Event 
The PFL points system is based on results of the match.  The winner of a fight receives 3 points.  If the fight ends in a draw, both fighters will receive 1 point. The bonus for winning a fight in the first, second, or third round is 3 points, 2 points, and 1 point respectively. The bonus for winning in the third round requires a fight be stopped before 4:59 of the third round.  No bonus point will be awarded if a fighter wins via decision.  For example, if a fighter wins a fight in the first round, then the fighter will receive 6 total points. A decision win will result in three total points.  If a fighter misses weight, the opponent (should they comply with weight limits) will receive 3 points due to a walkover victory, regardless of winning or losing the bout;  if the non-offending fighter subsequently wins with a stoppage, all bonus points will be awarded.

Welterweight

Lightweight

See also
 List of PFL events
 List of current PFL fighters

References 

2023 in sports in Nevada
Professional Fighters League
2023 in mixed martial arts
April 2023 sports events in the United States
Sports competitions in Las Vegas
Events in Las Vegas
Scheduled mixed martial arts events